Deh Shad-e Pain (also Romanized as Deh Shād-e Pā’īn; also known as Deh Shāh-e Pā’īn, Deh Shāhī Pā’īn, and Qal‘eh-ye Pā’īn Deh Shāh) is a village in Razakan Rural District, in the Central District of Shahriar County, Tehran Province, Iran. At the 2006 census, its population was 1,091, in 264 families.

References 

Populated places in Shahriar County